Wheeler Peak Glacier is a glacier situated at the base of Wheeler Peak within Great Basin National Park in the U.S. state of Nevada. It is the only glacier in the state, and one of the southernmost glaciers in the United States. The mountain top is also considered to be a horn, a peak carved and shaped by glaciers over a long period of time.

The glacier is also unique in that it contains many rocks and minerals, including limestone (found in the Lehman Caves), marble, sandstone, shale, quartzite, granite, aragonite, moonmilk, and gypsum.

Glacier details
This type of small glacier is generally found in mountainous terrain, and is also sometimes referred to as a "mountain", "niche", or "cirque" glacier.

The ice visible on the surface is only a portion of the whole glacier, the rest is covered with debris and therefore considered to be a rock glacier.

Looking at the glacier, it is easy to see arc-shaped ridges on the ice surface. The curvature is due to the way the glacier has grown; ice mass near the midline of the glacier creep faster than those on either side, causing the curvature. Because Wheeler Peak has a northeast-facing headwall, it has perennial snow, and is able to protect the glacier from the sun.

Access
There are several locations within the park from which the glacier can be viewed. The only vista available from the road, however, is from the Wheeler Peak Overlook on the Wheeler Peak Scenic Drive. The glacier can be seen at the bottom of the Wheeler Peak rock face.
The Bristlecone/Glacier Trail can be used to access the foot of the glacier, and is approximately  roundtrip. Hikers should be cautious when using the trail, as boulders may be unstable and small rockslides are common.

Climate history and change
The Wheeler Peak Glacier is a vestige of the last glacial maximum, when the climate was as much as 8 degrees (F) cooler than it is today. Specifically, there has been a global retreat of glaciers since 1850. Given current warming trends, the Wheeler Peak Glacier will likely disappear within the next 20 years.

See also 
 List of glaciers in the United States
 Climate Change
 List of highest points in Nevada by county
 Hazards of outdoor recreation
 Rock glacier

References 

Glaciers of Nevada
Great Basin National Park
Landforms of White Pine County, Nevada